The New Association of Friends is a Friends (Quaker) organization composed of fifteen congregations in three states Indiana, Ohio, and Michigan with most of the meetings located in east-central Indiana. The New Association has also welcomed individual members. 

The New Association was formed in 2013 by members of those fifteen congregations  which conjointly left Indiana Yearly Meeting. While the initial impetus for reconfiguration in Indiana Yearly Meeting was the publication of West Richmond Friends Meeting's welcoming and affirming minute the conversation had shifted towards authority within the yearly meeting. Indiana Yearly Meeting's faith and practice under the section on order and authority has this paragraph on subordination "Thus Monthly Meetings recognize the legitimate role of the Yearly Meeting in speaking and acting for the combined membership. Likewise the Yearly Meeting recognizes the freedom of Monthly Meetings and the validity of their prophetic voices. Each needs the other in order to be strong and vital. and both need the mediation of Christ and the guidance of the Holy Spirit."  The paragraph in question articulates a mutual subordination between Meetings and the Yearly Meeting and the vitality of such mutual subordination.  The New Association seeks to maintain a similar picture of subordination and mutual submission described in Ephesians 5:21 "submitting to one another out of reverence for Christ Jesus."

The New Association of Friends is a voluntary association of monthly meetings, churches and individuals that support worship, ministry and service through the cultivation of Christian faith in the Quaker tradition.

The New Association of Friends is a member of Friends United Meeting and Friends Committee on National Legislation. It is in the process of joining Friends World Committee for Consultation.

References

Quakerism
Quakerism in Indiana
Quakerism in Ohio
Quakerism in Michigan